In the field of audio recording, an aluminum disc (aluminium in the UK and elsewhere) is a phonograph (gramophone in the UK) record made of bare aluminum, a medium introduced in the late 1920s for making one-off recordings. Although sometimes used for making amateur studio or home recordings or in coin-operated "record-your-voice" booths at fairs and arcades, during the first half of the 1930s bare aluminum discs were primarily used to record radio broadcasts for the private transcription disc archives of performers or sponsors.

In the recording process, a sufficiently amplified audio signal was sent to a heavily weighted electromagnetic recording head with a blunt diamond stylus that indented, rather than cut or engraved, a sound-modulated groove into the surface of the metal. Normally, a completely blank disc was used and the recording head was slowly carried toward its center by a dedicated feed mechanism. Some low-end recording units economized by eliminating the feed mechanism, relying instead on the use of discs already cut with a narrow blank groove that guided the stylus, which simply impressed its vibrations into the upper region of the existing groove. This cost-cutting approach produced recordings with a very limited dynamic range and generally inferior sound. In either case, because of the grain structure of the metal and its resistance to the side-to-side motions of the recording stylus, significant surface noise was inherent and the high-frequency signal content was heavily attenuated.

The recording had to be played back with a fiber needle such as cut and pointed bamboo or a plant thorn, as an ordinary steel needle in a typical heavy pickup would severely damage the soft aluminum surface. Even when playing a bare aluminium disc with a modern lightweight magnetic cartridge, a hard stylus that does not correctly fit the contour of the groove will score its surface and tend to skip and repeat, damaging the disc as well as degrading the quality of the recovered audio. Because the blunt recording stylus typically bore down on the aluminum at a substantial angle, it produced a disproportionately shallow groove, so that optimum playback with modern equipment requires a custom stylus with an unusually large tip radius.

In 1934, the Pyral Company in France and the Presto Recording Corporation in the United States independently created the so-called acetate disc by coating a layer of nitrocellulose lacquer onto the aluminum, which now served only as a rigid support. Engraving the groove into an easily cut and grainless lacquer, rather than indenting it into bare metal, made it possible to produce a broadcast-quality recording that preserved high-frequency detail and was nearly noiseless when new. As a result, professional recording services soon abandoned the use of bare aluminum blanks, although some amateur and novelty use persisted into the 1940s. From an archival perspective, the changeover traded long-term stability for superior sound quality. A bare aluminum disc can remain unchanged indefinitely if carefully stored, while the coating on a lacquer disc is subject to chemical deterioration, tending to shrink and become brittle due to the loss of unstable plasticizers, which can cause the lacquer to develop cracks, split off from the aluminum base disc, and in severe cases disintegrate into an unsalvageable rubble of tiny flakes.

Most recordings on bare aluminum are believed to have perished in the scrap metal drives held during World War II. Aluminum was declared to be a critical war material and civilians in the US were urged to do their patriotic duty by finding and turning in anything made of it. The collected "scrap" was melted and recycled.

A selection of recently found EKCO aluminium discs containing home recordings of BBC radio broadcasts from 1932 to 1937 which escaped the above fate may be seen and heard at http://www.greenbank-records.com

In other fields, aluminum disc may refer to the aluminum core discs used for the "platters" in hard disk drives, or to discs used in various other products or manufacturing processes.

See also
 Acetate disc

References

Audio storage